The 2013 IWBF Men's U23 World Championship was the fifth edition of the IWBF U23 World Wheelchair Basketball Championship held in Adana, Turkey from 7 to 14 September 2013. The tournament was played in two venues, the Yüreğir Serinevler Arena and the Menderes Sports Hall.

Medalists

Squads
Each of the 12 teams selected a squad of up to 12 players for the tournament.

Athletes are given an eight-level-score specific to wheelchair basketball, ranging from 0.5 to 4.5. Lower scores represent a higher degree of disability The sum score of all players on the court cannot exceed 14.

Preliminary round
''All times local (UTC+03:00)

Group A

Group B

Knockout stage

Quarterfinals

9th-12th semifinals 
11th place game

9th place game

5th-8th semifinals 

7th place game

5th place game

Semifinals

Bronze medal game

Final

Final standings

References

External links
Official site
IWBF Ranking WCM-U23 - 2103

IWBF U23 World Wheelchair Basketball Championship
2013 in wheelchair basketball
International basketball competitions hosted by Turkey
Wheelchair basketball in Turkey
2013–14 in Turkish basketball
Sport in Adana
21st century in Adana